Fernando de Zeballos (9 September 1732, Espera – 1 March 1802) was a Spanish priest and writer. He studied art, theology, and civil rights at the University of Seville.

1732 births
1802 deaths
People from Sierra de Cádiz
Spanish Roman Catholic priests
Spanish male writers
Writers from Andalusia
University of Seville alumni